The Youngman-Baynes High Lift was a British experimental aircraft of the 1940s. It was a single-engine, low-wing monoplane with a fixed tailwheel undercarriage.

Development 
The High Lift was a "one-off" experimental, flying test-bed for the system of slotted flaps invented by R.T. Youngman. It was designed by L. E. Baynes AFRAeS, using components from the Percival Proctor, and built by Heston Aircraft Company Ltd. Test pilot Flight Lieutenant Ralph S Munday piloted the first flight at Heston Aerodrome on 5 February 1948, carrying the military serial VT789.

Operational history 
The High Lift was registered as G-AMBL on 10 May 1950. Its career ended in 1954 when it was presented to the College of Aeronautics at Cranfield.

Specifications

See also

References
Notes

Bibliography

1940s British experimental aircraft
Single-engined tractor aircraft
Low-wing aircraft
Aircraft first flown in 1948